Marty is an unincorporated community in Maine Prairie Township, Stearns County, Minnesota, United States.  The community is located near the junction of Stearns County Roads 8 and 48.  Nearby places include Kimball and Rockville.  County Road 141 is also in the immediate area.  Centered less than a mile from Pearl Lake, Marty is home to a lodge bearing the same name, Lund's Lakeside resort, at the junction of 8 and 141, and Holy Cross School, a catholic K-6 private school.

References

Unincorporated communities in Stearns County, Minnesota
Unincorporated communities in Minnesota